The OpenBSD Journal is an online newspaper dedicated to coverage of OpenBSD software and related events. The OpenBSD Journal is widely recognized as a reliable source of OpenBSD-related information. It is a primary reporter for such events as Hackathons. The site also hosts the OpenBSD developers' blogs.

History 
Daniel Hartmeier backed up the contents of the journal in order to preserve them. Further investigation to the articles' structure lead to creation of CGI-based engine that would enable access to the deadly.org's content on a backup server. Consequently, the functionality of adding new articles was implemented and the previous editors allowed to re-publish articles.

References 

Journal
Computing websites
Technology websites
Internet properties established in 2000